Tetuan is a station on the L2 line of the Barcelona metro network, located below Gran Via de les Corts Catalanes and Plaça de Tetuan in the Eixample district in central Barcelona. It was opened in 1995, along several other stations on the line. The station can be accessed from the entrances located on Carrer de Casp-Passeig de Sant Joan and Carrer de la Diputació-Passeig de Sant Joan.

Services

See also
List of Barcelona Metro stations

External links

Tetuan metro station at Trenscat.com

Railway stations in Spain opened in 1995
Barcelona Metro line 2 stations
Transport in Eixample